West Main Street Historic District in Oconto, Wisconsin is a historic district.

It was listed on the National Register of Historic Places in 1979.

It includes multiple buildings built during the heyday of the town's lumbering industry.  Two included properties were already listed on the National Register, the First Church of Christ, Scientist (Oconto, Wisconsin) at 102 Chicago Street, and the Gov. Edward Scofield House at 610 West Main.

References

Houses on the National Register of Historic Places in Wisconsin
Geography of Oconto County, Wisconsin
Houses in Oconto County, Wisconsin
Historic districts on the National Register of Historic Places in Wisconsin
National Register of Historic Places in Oconto County, Wisconsin